Cross is the third extended play by South Korean boy group Winner, released on October 23, 2019 under the label YG Entertainment. The EP features the lead single "Soso". The physical album comes in two versions: Crosslight and Crossroad.

Promotion

On October 7, Winner uploaded a poster to their official Instagram account indicating an upcoming album release. On October 10, the release date and title were unveiled.
On October 14, the track list and title track "Soso" were revealed.

Track listing

Charts

References

2019 EPs
Winner (band) EPs
YG Entertainment EPs